Tetragondacnus spilotus is a species of pearlfish found in the Pacific waters off of Sumatra where it has been recovered at a depth of just over .  This species is the only known member of its genus.

References

Carapidae
Monotypic fish genera
Fish described in 2007